Gretna bugoma is a species of butterfly in the family Hesperiidae. It is found in Uganda (from the western part of the country to the Bugoma Forest).

References

Endemic fauna of Uganda
Butterflies described in 1947
Hesperiinae